Mary, Queen of Scots (1542–1587), was queen regnant of Scotland and queen consort of France.

Mary, Queen of Scots, may also refer to:

People 
 Mary II of England (1662–1694), Queen regnant of Scotland, England and Ireland
 Mary of Guelders (1434–1463), Queen consort to James II of Scotland, and the regent of Scotland 1460–1463
 Mary of Guise (1515–1560), Queen consort to James V of Scotland and mother of Mary, Queen of Scots; regent of Scotland 1544–1560
 Henrietta Maria of France (1609–1669), Queen consort to Charles I of Scotland; also known as Queen Mary
 Mary of Modena (1658–1718), Queen consort to James VII of Scotland

Arts, entertainment, and media

Films
 Mary of Scotland (film), 1936, an American film
 Mary, Queen of Scots (1971 film), a British film
 Mary Queen of Scots (2013 film), a Swiss film
 Mary Queen of Scots (2018 film), a UK–US film

Literature
 Mary Queen of Scots (1969 book), a book by Lady Antonia Fraser
 Mary, Queen of Scots, an 1831 book by Mary Russell Mitford
 Mary, Queen of Scots and the Murder of Lord Darnley, a 2003 book by Alison Weir
 Queen of Scots: The True Life of Mary Stuart, a 2004 book by John Guy

Music
 Mary Queen of Scots (album), a 1994 album by Eugenius
 Mary, Queen of Scots (opera), a 1977 opera by Thea Musgrave

Other uses
 Mary Queen of Scots House, Jedburgh, Scotland

See also 

 Cultural depictions of Mary, Queen of Scots
 
 Mary Queen of Shops, a BBC television programme
 Mary, Queen of Tots, a 1925 short film
 Scottish queen (disambiguation)
 Mary (disambiguation)
 Maria Stuart (disambiguation)

Mary, Queen of Scots